Estonia has participated at the World Athletics Championships since 1993, winning 2 world titles, 6 silver medals and 2 bronze medals.

Summary

Medalists

See also
Estonia at the IAAF World Indoor Championships
Estonia at the European Athletics Championships

External links
Eesti Kergejõustikuliit 

Nations at the World Athletics Championships
 
Athletics in Estonia